Hambleton is a hamlet on the A170 road between Thirsk and Pickering in North Yorkshire, England. It lies on the Hambleton Hills 1 mile east of Sutton Bank.

The 1856 Ordnance Survey map shows the Hambleton Hotel (later the Hambleton Inn) at the location, but no hamlet.  By 1893 the wider settlement had appeared. The location was historically associated with horse racing.  Horse racing here is recorded from the early 17th century, although in 1775 races were transferred to the Knavesmire in York. Training has continued at Hambleton, associated with nearby Hambleton House.

The Hambleton Inn closed in 2015.

Most of the hamlet is in the civil parish of Cold Kirby in Ryedale district. The south part of the hamlet, including part of Hambleton Inn, is in the civil parish of Kilburn High and Low in Hambleton district.

References 

Hamlets in North Yorkshire
North York Moors